Alynda is a genus of moths in the family Oecophoridae.

Species
Alynda cinnamomea Clarke, 1978
Alynda sarissa Clarke, 1978
Alynda striata Clarke, 1978

References

Oecophorinae